William George Hooper (c. 1900 – 1964) was an association football player who represented New Zealand at international level.

Hooper played two official A-international matches for the All Whites in 1927, both against the touring Canadians, the first a 1–0 win on 9 July 1927, the second a 1–4 loss on 23 July, Hooper scoring New Zealand's goal.

Hooper was the first player to score in two different Chatham Cup finals, scoring two goals in Seacliff AFC's win in the inaugural 1923 final and also scoring for the same side in their 1925 final loss to Wellington YMCA.

References 

1964 deaths
New Zealand association footballers
New Zealand international footballers
Year of birth uncertain
Association footballers not categorized by position